Hail the Judge is a 1994 Hong Kong comedy film directed by Wong Jing, starring Stephen Chow, Cheung Man, and Ng Man Tat.

Synopsis
In 1874, an idle young man, Pao Lung Sing (Stephen Chow), is appointed as county magistrate-in-waiting, a minor governmental official, after his father, a retired governmental official, purchased the position for him. Because the county magistrate Chan Pak Cheung had taken leave due to illness, Pao becomes acting magistrate, accompanied by his cowardly but loyal nephew, Pao Yau Wai (Ng Man-tat), as his advisor and personal assistant. 

Pao is descendant to the famed Sung Dynasty judge Pao Ching, who is known for his impartiality. Pao, however, is corrupt and despised by the public for his money-digging ways, but is popular with the local gentry. He was invited by Master Chi, a rich merchant, to attend the wedding between his tuberculosis-ridden son and Chin Lin (Sharla Cheung Man), a beautiful young woman. During the wedding, however, Lei Pao (known by his nickname "Panther), the top kuai of the Peking yamen, storms the occasion, claiming that the Chi family is harboring criminals on the run, who had disguised themselves as commoner guests at the wedding banquet. After subjugating the criminals, Lei threatens the Chi family for a bribe to be left alone, as he is also highly corrupt. Lei also robs the local citizenry of their material possessions using his masterful wushu techniques. Pao quickly shows allegiance to Lei, much to the disappointment to Master Chi, and offers to throw a banquet for Lei at the magistrate's court, promising many prostitutes. The offer pleases Lei, but when he arrived at the court, he is subdued by the guards. It turns out that Pao feigned allegiance to Lei and had planned on subduing him from causing further harm to innocent people. For this act, Pao is redeemed in the eyes of the county's folk.

Shang Wai (Collin Chou), the spoiled son of Navy Commander Shang Kwan (Ku Feng) and uncle-in-law to Chin Lin (now "Chi Siu Ling" by marriage), has an affair with his cousin and Siu Ling's mother-in-law, Yiu Yuen Kwan (Wong Fung-King). During the wedding banquet, Shang is smitten by the beauty of Siu Ling. Three months later, when on a visit to the Chi family, Shang secretly drugged Siu Ling and raped her when she was praying to the Buddha. Siu Ling awakens during the act, however, and after fiercely resisting, escapes. In a fit of uncontrollable rage, Shang murders all other members of the Chi family and burns their estate. Pao and the guards sees the fire when drinking out late, and apprehends Shang, detaining him in the county prison.

The wealth of the Shang family allows them to recruit the famed lawyer "Mirror" Fong Tong Kan, one of the Four Legendary Advocates of Canton, equally famous for his skill and his lack of scruples. Buttering up to Pao, Fong requests for permission for Shang's grandmother to visit him in jail, which Pao grants. Fong brings Kwan instead, and cooks up a plan to frame Siu Ling for the murders instead. Kwan's men removed evidence of Shang's involvement and planted evidence that indicted Siu Ling. To prevent Pao from interfering, Fong offers Pao a generous bribe, knowing that he could not resist such an amount. The next day, Fong successfully sued Pao for corruption, a charge that he could not deny and was thus taken into custody. He subsequently convinced the acting judge that Siu Ling committed the crime, who ordered Siu Ling to be placed on death row, putting her in jail after caning her half to death.

Utilizing connections from Pao's father, Yau Wai manages to break Pao out of jail. Pao promises Siu Ling to bring Shang to justice and save her. On his deathbed, Pao's father asks Pao to seek help from Lord Fa, the Minister of Justice and his old friend, in Peking. During their journey, they encounter all sorts of wacky characters, including Stone Mansion a circus performer and Yu Yin a classy prostitute. In the end, the real perpetrator of the mass murder is cut in half with a guillotine and the corrupt officials are brought to justice including lawyer Fong.

Cast
 Stephen Chow - Judge Bao Sing/Pao Lung Sing
 Sharla Cheung Man - Mrs. Chi Siu Lin
 Ng Man-tat - Pao Yau Wai
 Christy Chung - Stone Mansion
 Ada Choi - Yu Yin
 Collin Chou as Shang Wai
 Elvis Tsui - Panther/Lui Pao
 Wong Yat-fei - Magistrate Chan Pak Cheung
 Lawrence Ng - Mirror Fong Tong Kan
 Joey Leung - Stone Talk
 Ku Feng - Navy Commander Shang Kwan
 Ng Wui - Sing's father
 Lee Kin-Yan - Yu Fa
Kingdom Yuen - Auntie San
 John Ching - Loi Fook
 Teresa Ha Ping - Sing's mother
 Lau Shun - Eunuch Lee Lin Ying
 Gabriel Wong Yat-San - Majesty/Ai Shin Chue Luo
 Wong Hung - Lin Chi Yong
 Tenky Tin Kai-Man - MasterChi's sick son
 Leung Kai-Chi - Master Chi
 Tang Tai-Wo - One of 3 notorious robbers
 Wong Kar-Leung - One of 3 notorious robbers
 Choi Kin-Shing - One of 3 notorious robbers
 Jacky Cheung Chun-Hung - Eunuch Lee's bodyguard
 So Wai-Nam - Home Affair Secretary's bodyguard
 Chang Kin-Ming - Time reporter
 Hui Sze-Man - Prostitute
 Chan Man-Hiu - Matchmaker
 Wong Fung-King - Yiu Yuen Kwan
 John Cheung Chan-Sang - Wong Lo Chou
 Lui Siu-Ming - Constable
 William Leung Chi-Ming - Wedding guest
 Yeung Wo - Drugstore keeper Chu Yee

Sources:

References

External links
 
 Hail the Judge (1994) at Hong Kong Cinemagic
 Hail the Judge (1994) at chinesemov.com
 

1994 comedy films
1994 films
1990s Cantonese-language films
Films directed by Wong Jing
Hong Kong comedy films
Films set in the Qing dynasty
Films set in 1874
Films set in 1875
1990s Hong Kong films